Medved means bear in several Slavic languages, including Slovene, Slovak, Ukrainian, Russian, Czech, and Serbian. It is a gender-neutral surname in most languages, except Slovak and Czech. The Slovak feminine form is Medveďová.

People
 Adriana Medveďová (born 1992), Slovak handballer
 Aleksandr Medved (born 1937), Soviet-Belarusian wrestler
 Andrej Medved (born 1947), Slovene poet
 David Medved (1926–2009), American physicist and father of Michael Medved
 Dirk Medved (born 1968), Belgian footballer
 Elena Medved (born 1985), Russian footballer
 Igor Medved (born 1981), Slovene ski jumper
 Jonathan Medved (born 1955), American entrepreneur and investor
 Klemen Medved (born 1988), Slovene footballer
 Maureen Medved, Canadian writer and playwright
 Matej Medveď (1996–2020), Slovak sport shooter
 Matt Medved, American journalist and entrepreneur
 Michael Medved (born 1948), American talk radio host and author
 Mikhail Medved (born 1964), Ukrainian decathlete
 Nanette Medved (born 1970), Filipino actress
 Niko Medved (born 1973), American basketball coach
 Oleksandr Medved (born 1996), Ukrainian footballer
 Ron Medved (born 1944), American football player
 Samo Medved (born 1962), Slovene archer
 Shawn Medved, American soccer player
 Tatjana Medved (born 1974), Serbian handball player
 Tereza Medveďová (born 1996), Slovak racing cyclist
 Tomáš Medveď (born 1973), Slovak footballer
 Vladimir Medved (born 1999), Belarusian footballer
 Žan Medved (born 1999), Slovene footballer

See also
 
Medvedev, Russian variant of the surname
Medve, a Hungarian dialectic variant 
Nedvěd, a Czech dialectic variant

Slavic-language surnames
Surnames from nicknames